O'Dell is a surname.

O'Dell may also refer to:

O'Dell, British Columbia, railway point on the British Columbia Railway in Canada
O'dell Owens (1947–2022), American physician, public health official, and educator

See also
Odell (disambiguation)
Dell (disambiguation)